T. Percy Davies (birth unknown – death unknown), also known by the nickname of "Ponty", was a Welsh professional rugby league footballer who played in the 1920s.

International honours
Davies won 2 caps for Wales in 1926–1927 while at Pontypridd and while at Warrington in 1928.

References

External links
(archived by web.archive.org) Statistics at wolvesplayers.thisiswarrington.co.uk

Place of birth missing
Place of death missing
Rugby league players from Pontypridd
Rugby league props
Rugby league second-rows
Wales national rugby league team players
Warrington Wolves players
Welsh rugby league players
Year of birth missing
Year of death missing